A congregational mosque or Friday mosque (masjid jāmi‘, or simply: , jāmi‘), or sometimes great mosque or grand mosque (jāmi‘ kabir), is a mosque for hosting the Friday noon prayers known as jumu'ah. It can also host the Eid prayers in situations when there is no musalla or eidgah available nearby to host the prayers. In early Islamic history, the number of congregational mosques in one city was strictly limited. As cities and populations grew over time, it became more common for many mosques to host Friday prayers in the same area.

Etymology
The full Arabic term for this kind of mosque is masjid jāmi‘, which is typically translated as "mosque of congregation" or "congregational mosque". "Congregational" is used to translate jāmi‘, which comes from the Arabic root "ج - م - ع" which has a meaning ‘to bring together’ or ‘to unify’ (verbal form:  and ). In Arabic, the term is typically simplified to just jāmi‘. Similarly, in Turkish the term cami is used for the same purpose. As the distinction between a "congregational mosque" and other mosques has diminished in more recent history, the Arabic terms masjid and jami' have become more interchangeable.

In non-Arab Muslim nations, the word jāmi‘ ("that which gathers, congregates or assembles") is often conflated with another word from the same root, jumu‘ah, a term which refers to the Friday noon prayers or the Friday itself. This is due to the fact that the jumu'ah prayers require congregations and are only held in congregational mosques, usually the main mosque or central mosque of a town or city, and hence they are also sometimes known as Friday mosques.

History 

Since the early periods of Islam, a functional distinction existed between large central mosques built and controlled by the state versus small local mosques built and maintained by the general population. In the early years of Islam, under the Rashidun caliphs and many of the Umayyad caliphs, each city generally had only one congregational mosque where Friday prayers were held, while smaller mosques for regular prayers were built in local neighbourhoods. In fact, in some parts of the Islamic world such as in Egypt, Friday services were initially not permitted in villages and in other areas outside the main city where the congregational mosque stood. The ruler or governor of the city usually built his residence (the dar al-imara) next to the congregational mosque, and in this early period the ruler also delivered the khutbah (Friday sermon) during Friday prayers. This practice was inherited from the example of Muhammad and was passed on the caliphs after him. In the provinces, the local governors who ruled on behalf of the caliph were expected to deliver the khutbah for their local community. The minbar, a kind of pulpit from which the khutbah was traditionally given, also became a standard feature of congregational mosques by the early Abbasid period (late eighth century).

In later centuries, as the Islamic world became increasingly divided between different political states, as the Muslim population and the cities grew, and as new rulers wished to leave their mark of patronage, it became common to have multiple congregational mosques in the same city. For example, Fustat, the predecessor of modern Cairo, was founded in the seventh century with just one congregational mosque (the Mosque of Amr ibn al-As). However, by the 15th century, under the Mamluks, the urban agglomeration of Cairo and Fustat had 130 congregational mosques. In fact, the city became so saturated with congregational mosques that by the late 15th century its rulers could rarely build new ones. A similar proliferation of congregational mosques occurred in the cities of Syria, Iraq, Iran, and Morocco, as well as in the newly conquered Constantinople (Istanbul) under Ottoman rule.

Architecture and function 
Congregational mosques function as a community space. As a community space, it allows for prayer and social engagement. Congregational mosques have a crucial role in communities Islamic practices. The Qur'an does not state architectural parameters for a congregational mosque, and as a result there are both differences and similarities between congregational mosques of different regions. As all male members of the community are expected to attend Friday prayers, congregational mosques must be large enough to accommodate them and their size thus varies from community to community. The Qur'an does highlight that the prayer hall has to accommodate the population of the community. Almost all congregational mosques feature a minbar, which is an elevated platform where the Friday sermon is given. The minbar is usually places near the qibla wall (the wall standing in the direction of prayer) and the mihrab.

See also
 Salat, formal worship in Islam
 Lists of mosques
 List of largest mosques
 List of mosques
 List of the oldest mosques

References

Mosques
Islamic architecture
Islam-related lists
!
Architecture in Iran